John Michael Moore (1 February 1943 – 4 November 2009) was an English footballer who made 30 appearances in the Football League for Lincoln City. He played as a winger or forward. Moore also played non-league football in the east Midlands, including appearing in the Midland Counties League for Arnold and Ilkeston Town.

References

1943 births
2009 deaths
Footballers from Nottingham
English footballers
Association football wingers
Arnold F.C. players
Lincoln City F.C. players
Ilkeston Town F.C. (1945) players
English Football League players
Midland Football League players
People from Carlton, Nottinghamshire
People from Calverton, Nottinghamshire
Footballers from Nottinghamshire